Baron Claus-Detlof von Oertzen (13 April 1894 – 25 July 1991) was involved in the motor industry for most of his long life and is sometimes referred to as the “Father of Volkswagen of South Africa”.

During 1932, four motor manufacturers of Saxony in Germany, namely Audi, DKW, Horch and Wanderer, amalgamated under the pressures of the depressed German economy to form Auto Union. The new company’s four-ringed emblem, which von Oertzen suggested, can still be seen in the modern Audi logo. Baron von Oertzen, who had been in charge of sales at Wanderer, became sales director and chairman of the board of directors of Auto Union.

Von Oertzen wanted a showpiece project that would bring fame to his new firm. Together with Ferdinand Porsche and Hans Stuck (senior), one of Germany’s most successful racing drivers, they began work on a new “people’s car” and also a government-sponsored racing programme. Mercedes-Benz was not pleased at this turn of events and a great rivalry began on the race circuits.

Von Oertzen became uneasy in pre-war Germany and in 1935 decided to relocate to South Africa. From 1936 he initiated the export of the DKW saloon car to South Africa and Australia and in  1937 he arranged for the Auto Union Grand Prix racing cars to be brought out to South Africa for promotional purposes. They competed in Cape Town and East London.

In addition to South Africa and Australia, von Oertzen also worked in Indonesia, where he and his wife, Irene, were interned in separate prison camps during the Second World War.

After the war, Volkswagen in Germany appointed him as their representative in South Africa. He was instrumental in the early stages of negotiations to bring Volkswagen to South Africa, and was present at the historic signing in 1951 of the agreement between SAMAD and Volkswagenwerk to assemble Volkswagens in Uitenhage. He became Chairman of SAMAD in 1956 when Volkswagenwerk took over a controlling interest in the company.

The first Kombi in South Africa, a gift to a German malaria researcher who had to traverse southern and central Africa, landed in Cape Town in December 1952. Soon afterwards, a second Kombi, fitted out as a hunting vehicle/ camper for Baron von Oertzen, arrived in Port Elizabeth. The owners tested both vehicles to their limits across the most inhospitable terrain. In 1956, Ben Pon, the Dutch Volkswagen dealer who could be regarded as the architect of the Kombi, visited South Africa as guest of von Oertzen. Being keen hunters, the men conducted several expeditions in von Oertzen’s Jagdwagen Kombi. (This vehicle still exists and can be seen in the new modern VWSA museum called the AutoPavilion, next to the factory entrance in Uitenhage).

Baroness von Oertzen in her later years divided her time between Johannesburg and Switzerland. She was a guest of honour at the opening of the AutoPavilion in 2004. She died in April, 2007

References

External links
 Volkswagen South Africa official website

1894 births
1991 deaths
Barons of Germany
Volkswagen Group executives
People in the automobile industry
German emigrants to South Africa